

References

 Aponte, Roger (1984). Apuntes sobre el último ferrocarril de Puerto Rico, Ponce & Guayama Railroad. Ponce: Editorial Kider Printing. (in Spanish)
 Pumarada, Luis (1980). Trasfondo histórico del ferrocarril en Puerto Rico. Mayagüez: Centro de Investigaciones de Ingeniería, Recinto Universitario de Mayagüez. (in Spanish)

Puerto Rico railroads
Railway lines in Puerto Rico
Rail transport in Puerto Rico
Narrow gauge railroads in Puerto Rico
Sugar mill railways
Metre gauge railways